Clara Eleanor Longworth de Chambrun, Comtesse de Chambrun (October 18, 1873 – June 1, 1954) was an American patron of the arts and scholar of Shakespeare. Ezra Pound included her in a list of contemporary persons "ham ignorant of things they should have learned in high school."

Early life
Longworth de Chambrun was born in Cincinnati, Ohio on October 18, 1873.  She was a daughter of Nicholas Longworth and the former Susan Walker.  She belonged to a wealthy family that was involved in Ohio politics. Her father was an Ohio State Supreme Court judge, and her brother (also named Nicholas Longworth) was a congressman from Ohio for three decades, eventually becoming Speaker of the United States House of Representatives from 1925-31. He married Alice Roosevelt (daughter of President Theodore Roosevelt) in 1906. She was reputed to dislike Alice. She was friends with Josephine Crane, the second wife of Winthrop M. Crane, governor of Massachusetts.

She was attendant at her cousin Margaret Rives Nichols's marriage to the Marquis Pierre de Chambrun (elder brother of diplomat and writer Charles de Chambrun) on December 12, 1895.

Career
In 1921, the same year that her daughter died, she earned a doctorate from the Sorbonne, at the age of 48, and five years later she received the Bordin Prize of the Académie française for a book on Shakespeare which she wrote in French. She was one of the founding members of the American Library in Paris, and served as a trustee from 1921 through 1924. This was followed in 1928 by her election as a Chevalier of the French Legion of Honour.

Through her son's marriage to the daughter of the Premier of France, the Countess was able to keep the American Library in Paris open even after France's declaration of war in September 1939, organized an administrative set-up which made it possible to keep it independent after the U.S. entered the war. She acted as its director until the fall of 1944 when her ties to Laval became a liability. Before she died, however, thanks were given to her for her actions.

Personal life 
She married Count Aldebert de Chambrun, later General de Chambrun, a direct descendant of the Marquis de Lafayette on February 19, 1901 in Cincinnati. Aldebert was the French Military attaché in Washington, D.C. at one time, before serving as an artillery officer in World War I. He is reputed to have written his wife about the pleasure he had in shelling his own château, near Saint-Mihiel, with artillery as part of a six-week siege because it was occupied by German forces, though this later turned out to be a hoax. Together, they were the parents of two children:

 Suzanne Eleanore de Chambrun  (1902–1921), who died of heart disease in Paris. 
 René de Chambrun (1906–2002), who married Josée Laval in 1935.  Josée was the daughter of Pierre Laval, who was then serving as Premier of France.

In the fall of 1935, the countess rented her apartment at 58 rue de Vaugirard, at the corner of the Luxembourg Garden to the young poet Elizabeth Bishop, where Bishop wrote "Cirque d'Hiver", her first poem to be published in The New Yorker, and "Paris, 7 AM".

Works

Playing with Souls: A Novel, 1922.
 Giovanni Florio - Un apôtre de la Renaissance en Angleterre à l'époque de Shakespeare, 1922.
Shakespeare, auteur, poète, 1927.
Shakespeare, Actor-poet: As Seen by his Associates, Explained by Himself and Remembered by the Succeeding Generation, 1927.
His Wife's Romance, 1929.
Hamlet, de Shakespeare, 1931.

Two Loves I Have: The Romance of William Shakespeare. Philadelphia: J.B. Lippincott, 1934.

Cincinnati: Story of the Queen City. New York: Scribner, 1939.
Shakespeare retrouvé, 1948.

References

Further reading
 Glass, Charles (2009). Americans in Paris: Life and Death Under Nazi Occupation, Harper Collins, U.K. .

External links
Between Two Worlds: The American Library in Paris

1873 births
1954 deaths
American socialites
Writers from Cincinnati
University of Paris alumni
English–French translators
Shakespearean scholars
Chevaliers of the Légion d'honneur
Burials at Picpus Cemetery
20th-century American women writers
20th-century American writers
20th-century translators
American translators
American expatriates in France
Longworth family